Frederick George Austral Hanson (15 May 1888 – 21 September 1979) was an Australian rules footballer who played with St Kilda in the Victorian Football League (VFL).

Notes

External links 

Fred Hanson's playing statistics from The VFA Project

1888 births
1979 deaths
Australian rules footballers from Melbourne
St Kilda Football Club players
Footscray Football Club (VFA) players
People from St Kilda, Victoria